Paul Louis Riebesell (9 June 1883, Hamburg – 16 March 1950, Hamburg) was a German mathematician, statistician, actuary, and president of Hamburger Feuerkasse. At the International Congress of Mathematicians, he was an invited speaker in 1932 in Zürich and in 1936 in Oslo.

Biography
Riebesell studied mathematics and natural sciences in Munich, in Berlin, and at the University of Kiel, where he received his doctorate in 1905 under the supervision of Paul Stäckel. After receiving his doctorate Riebesell was a Studienrat for a number of years in Hamburg. In 1918 he became the second director of the Hamburg Jugendamt. He wrote a commentary on the Reichsgesetz für Jugendwohlfahrt (Youth Welfare Law). He published research on Einstein's theory of relativity. After he habilitated at the University of Hamburg, there at the beginning of the 1920s he was appointed an außerordentlicher Professor (non-tenured professor) in actuarial mathematics and remained in that position until 1934. In 1923 the city of Hamburg appointed him director of Hamburger Feuerkasse. In 1934 he was elected president of the Reichsverband des öffentlich-rechtlichen Versicherung (Reich Association of Public Insurance Companies). in 1937 he lost this position for political reasons. In 1938 he became the director of the life insurance company Isar Lebensversicherungs-AG with headquarters in Munich. He was also a professor honorarius from 1935 to 1940 at the Technische Hochschule Berlin (TH Berlin), from 1935 at the Humboldt University of Berlin, and from 1938 at the Ludwig Maximilian University of Munich. After WW II he returned to Hamburg as president of Hamburger Feuerkasse and held that position until his death in 1950. In 1948 he co-founded the Deutsche Gesellschaft für Versicherungsmathematik (German Society for Actuarial Mathematics) and became its first chairman.

Riebesell dealt with the influence of currency devaluation on insurance benefits. His achievement in actuarial science lies primarily in the transfer of actuarial approaches from life insurance to property insurance. He published, with Rudolf Lencer, the textbook and reference book "Deutsche Versicherungswirtschaft" (6 vols., 1936–39).

During WWI, a thousand copies of Riebesell's booklet Mathematik im Krieg (Mathematics in war) were sent, free of charge, to the front.

Riebesell was a member of the NSDAP. He signed the Bekenntnis der Professoren an den Universitäten und Hochschulen zu Adolf Hitler und dem nationalsozialistischen Staat, which was published in November 1933.

In 1922 he married Elisabeth Lengstorf (1897–1976). They had two sons and four daughters.

Selected publications
 Die mathematischen Grundlagen der Variations- und Vererbungslehre (1916)
 Mathematische Statistik und Biometrik (1932 & 1944)
 Mathematik des täglichen Lebens (1942, banned after 1945 in the Soviet Occupation Zone, & 1948)
 as co-editor: Handbuch der Versicherung (Hamburg 1938)
 Einführung in die Sachversicherungsmathematik (1936)
 Die Relativitätstheorie im Unterricht (1926)
 Über die geometrischen Deutungen der Relativitätstheorie, Mitteilungen der mathematischen Gesellschaft 5 (1914), pp. 130–140.
 Die Beweise für Relativitätstheorie, Naturwissenschaften 4 (1916), pp. 97–101. 
 
 Mathematik im Krieg (1916)
 Photogrammetrie in der Schule (1914)

Sources
 Wolfgang Poppelbaum: Paul Riebesell, In: Hamburgische Biografie. Personenlexikon, vol. 1, Hamburg 2001 pp. 252–254

References

External links
 
 
 R.J.Pabst zu Riebesells mathematischen Ansätzen S. 84 ff

20th-century German mathematicians
Actuaries
University of Kiel alumni
University of Hamburg alumni
Academic staff of the University of Hamburg
Academic staff of the Technical University of Berlin
Academic staff of the Ludwig Maximilian University of Munich
Nazi Party members
People from Hamburg
1883 births
1950 deaths